Mauritius Wilde (born 27 October 1965) is a German Benedictine monk, priest, professor, podcaster, spiritual director, and author. He is a member of Münsterschwarzach Abbey located in Bavaria, Germany, which is part of the Benedictine Congregation of Saint Ottilien. In 2016 he was appointed by the Abbot Primate of the Benedictine Confederation to serve as Prior of the Benedictine Primatial Abbey of the Sant'Anselmo in Rome, Italy.

Biography

Early life 
Wilde was born in Hildesheim, Germany, to Werner and Dr. Elfriede (née Brunbauer) Wilde, and he has one older brother. He attended "Gymnasium Josephinum Hildesheim" from 1976 to 1985 before entering the Benedictine life.

Monastic Life 
Wilde joined Münsterschwarzach Abbey at 19 years of age and was given at his monastic profession in 1990 the name "Mauritius" in honor of Saint Maurice. He would later study Philosophy and Theology at the Julius-Maximilians-Universität Würzburg receiving a diploma in 1992. He continued his theological studies at the University of Tübingen where he specialized in the German Dominican mystic Meister Eckhart and in 2000 received his Ph.D. with a dissertation entitled "Das Neue Bild vom Gottesbild. Bild und Theologie bei Meister Eckhart".

His first assignment was as a Prefect in the monastery's boarding school of St. Egbert-Gymnasium, but he also worked in youth ministry and vocations. He would later be appointed as director of the Abbey's publishing house known as "Vier-Türme-Verlag" serving from 1999 to 2010. In keeping with the missionary tradition of the Benedictine Congregation of Saint Ottilien, he would be assigned in 2011 as Prior of Christ the King Priory located in Schuyler, Nebraska, United States. During his time there he expanded his own missionary work through offering spiritual retreats, blogging, social media, and podcasting.

On 23 September 2016 Abbot Primate Gregory Polan of the Benedictine Confederation, appointed Wilde as the new Prior of the Primatial Abbey of Sant'Anselmo located in Rome, Italy. This appointment also made him the Rector of the College of Sant'Anselmo, which is an ecclesiastical residential college in the Roman tradition. The "Collegio Sant'Anselmo" serves as both a house of formation for Benedictines, but also as a residence for over one hundred monks from around forty countries, religious, diocesan priests, and lay people. It offers a monastic environment for those who study at the onsite Pontifical Athenaeum of Saint Anselm or at other Roman pontifical universities. Wilde would later be appointed to additionally serve as a lecturer and professor at the Pontifical Athenaeum of Saint Anselm, specializing in Spiritual Theology and the Rule of St. Benedict. Given his proficiency in German, Italian, and English, along with his expertise in spiritual theology and the use of digital media technology, he has also been called upon to offer spiritual commentaries through the international "Vatican News".

On 24 November 2021, Wilde was elected as the new President of the Association of the Rectors of Ecclesiastical Colleges of Rome.

Bibliography

Publications
Wilde has a number of publications in German, English, Italian, Croatian, and Spanish. His works are catalogued in the KATALOG DER DEUTSCHEN NATIONALBIBLIOTHEK. Some of his publications include:

 Ich verstehe dich nicht: Die Herzensreise des kleinen Prinzen, Vier-Türme-Verlag (1994)  
 Das neue Bild vom Gottesbild: Bild und Theologie bei Meister Eckhart, Freiburger Universitätsverlag (2000)  
 Der spirituelle Weg: Die Entwicklung des Benedikt von Nursia, Vier-Türme-Verlag (2001)  
 Petrus und Paulus. Wer in Gruppen entscheidet: die Unternehmer-Verwalter-Typologie, Vier-Türme-Verlag (2003)  
 Respekt, Die Kunst der gegenseitigen Wertschätzung, Vier-Türme-Verlag (2009; Revised edition 2020)  
 Nüchternheit. Die Kunst, sich ein achtsames Herz zu bewahren, Vier-Türme-Verlag (2018)  
 Be yourself!: the call of a Christian, Paulist Press (2019)

Articles in journals

 Der sie bei Tag und Nacht verklagte..., Erbe und Auftrag (2019, vol. 4, pp. 375–386)  
 Formation– Ideen, Institutionen, Erfahrungen (with David Forster, Bruno Rieder, Justina Metzdorf, Paulus Koci), Erbe und Auftrag (2020, vol. 2, pp. 164–178)

References

External links
 The Benedictine Confederation of Congregations of Monasteries of the Order of Saint Benedict  
 Collegio Sant'Anselmo (in Italian and English)
 Pontificio Ateneo Sant'Anselmo (in Italian and English)
 Association of Ecclesiastical Colleges of Rome  
 Münsterschwarzach Abbey website  
 Podcasts with Wilde 

1965 births
Living people
German Benedictines
German male non-fiction writers
German
21st-century German theologians
German Roman Catholic theologians